Pyari Behna is a 1985 Indian Hindi-language drama film directed by Bapu, starring Mithun Chakraborty, Padmini Kolhapure, Vinod Mehra, Deven Verma, Shakti Kapoor and Tanvi Azmi in her film debut. The film is a remake of the 1978 Tamil film Mullum Malarum.

Plot 
Kaali and his sister Seeta live in a shanty house. He assists the Engineer Vinay. Mangla, Seeta's friend falls in love with Kali and they gets married, much to the delight of his sister. Now Kali meets with an accident and loses his left hand. He blames Vinay for the accident. Now Vinay falls in love with Kaali's sister Seeta, but Kaali is against their relationship.

Cast 
Mithun Chakraborty as  Kalicharan "Kali"
Padmini Kolhapure as Mangala
Tanvi Azmi as Seeta
Vinod Mehra as Vinay Verma
Deven Verma as Makhan Singh 
Shakti Kapoor as Nekiram Chaturvedi
Huma Khan as Banjaran
Nirmala as Champa
Meenakshi as Chameli
Nalini as Bijli
Asha Shah as Mangala's Mother
Master Chotu as young Kali

Soundtrack 
The soundtrack was composed by Bappi Lahiri.

References 

 http://ibosnetwork.com/asp/filmbodetails.asp?id=Pyari+Behna

External links 
 

1985 films
1980s Hindi-language films
Hindi remakes of Tamil films
Films directed by Bapu
Films scored by Bappi Lahiri